George William Joy (7 July 1844 in Dublin, Ireland – 28 October 1925 in Purbrook, Hampshire) was an Irish painter in London.

Life and career
Joy was the son of William Bruce Joy, MD, and the brother of sculptor Albert Bruce-Joy, descendants of an old Huguenot family which settled in Antrim in 1612.

He was initially destined for the military and was also an accomplished violin player. After a foot injury at young age, his father declared him unfit for military service. Joy was then educated at Harrow School and eventually pursued a career as an artist. He studied in London's South Kensington School of Art and later at the Royal Academy under John Everett Millais, Frederic Leighton and George Frederic Watts; among his fellow students was Hubert von Herkomer.

In 1868 Joy went to Paris where for two years he was a student of Charles-François Jalabert and Léon Bonnat. There he met masters like Gérôme, Cabanel, Jules Breton, Jules Lefebvre und Philippe Rousseau.

Going back to London, Joy established himself as a history and genre painter, and became a frequent exhibitor at the Royal Academy, the Salon des artistes français and the Royal Hibernian Academy.
He became a member of the Royal Institute of Oil Painters in 1895.

To satisfy his early military ambitions, Joy entered the Artists Rifles where he was known as a good shot, representing Ireland several times. He spent many winters in Swanage from 1896 and eventually retired to Purbrook. Both of his sons were killed in 1915 during World War I.

Works
Joy's paintings covered a variety of themes from strictly historical to religious and allegorical. He also painted portraits.

His pursuit of the perfect female form in nude paintings like Laodamia (1878; Portsmouth City Museum), The Danaids (1887) and Truth (1892-93) are unusually bold for England and refer back to the French classicist tradition of Ingres and Girodet-Trioson.

Opposing home rule for Ireland and advocating the unity of the British Isles, Joy painted several patriotic images with allegories like Rose, Shamrock and Thistle (1889) and The First Union Jack (1892) as well as historic examples of rebellions like Flora MacDonald's Farewell to Prince Charlie and The King's Drum Shall Never be Beaten for Rebels, 1798  (1891; Bournemouth, Russell-Cotes Art Gallery and Museum).

He was perhaps best known for his depiction of heroism in a painting entitled The Death of General Gordon, Khartoum, 26 January 1885 (1893; Leeds City Museum). Picturing a final moment in the very recent British history of the Siege of Khartoum, Gordon is pictured bravely facing his fate, standing above the followers of the invading Mahdi army moments before being struck down by a spear.

Another well known, yet profoundly different work by Joy is the highly contemporary scene The Bayswater Omnibus (1895; Museum of London - image here).

One of his most evocative paintings is  Joan of Arc, guarded in her sleep by an angel (1895; Rouen, Musée des Beaux Arts - image here).

References

The work of George W. Joy with an autobiographical sketch, London, Cassell, 1904.
George W. Joy from Grove Art Online via ArtMagick.

External links

Art UK.
ArtMagick Image Gallery.
The Athenæum.

1844 births
1925 deaths
People educated at Harrow School
Alumni of the Royal College of Art
Anglo-Irish artists
Irish male painters
19th-century British painters
20th-century British painters
19th-century painters of historical subjects
Artists' Rifles soldiers
British male painters
Orientalist painters
Artists from Dublin (city)
People from Purbrook